The 1999 Redcar and Cleveland Borough Council election took place on 6 May 1999 to elect members of Redcar and Cleveland Unitary Council in England. The whole council was up for election and the Labour Party stayed in overall control of the council.

Election result
Overall turnout at the election was 37%.

References

1999 English local elections
1999
1990s in North Yorkshire